Adventures of Carol is a 1917 American silent drama film directed by Harley Knoles and starring Madge Evans, George MacQuarrie and Rosina Henley.

Cast
 Madge Evans as Carol Montgomery 
 George MacQuarrie as Col. Montgomery 
 Rosina Henley as Mrs. Montgomery 
 Carl Axzelle as James 
 Nick Long Jr. as Beppo 
 Kate Lester as Mme. Fairfax 
 Jack Drumier as Mr. Fairfax 
 Frances Miller as Mammy Lou

References

Bibliography
 Gevinson, Alan. Within Our Gates: Ethnicity in American Feature Films, 1911-1960. University of California Press, 1997.

External links
 

1917 films
1917 drama films
1910s English-language films
American silent feature films
Silent American drama films
Films directed by Harley Knoles
American black-and-white films
World Film Company films
1910s American films